First-seeded Margaret Smith defeated fifth-seeded Darlene Hard 9–7, 6–4 in the final to win the women's singles tennis title at the 1962 U.S. National Championships. The tournament was played on outdoor grass courts and held from August 29 through September 10, 1962 at the West Side Tennis Club in Forest Hills, Queens, New York.

The draw consisted of 96 players of which eight were seeded.

Seeds
The seeded players are listed below. Margaret Smith is the champion; others show in brackets the round in which they were eliminated.

  Margaret Smith  (champion) 
  Karen Hantze Susman (third round)
  Maria Bueno (semifinals)
  Věra Suková (quarterfinals)
  Darlene Hard (finalist)
  Renée Schuurman (third round)
  Lesley Turner (fourth round)
  Sandra Reynolds Price (quarterfinals)

Draw

Key
 Q = Qualifier
 WC = Wild card
 LL = Lucky loser
 r = Retired

Final eight

References

1962
1962 in women's tennis
1962 in American women's sports
Wom
Women's sports in New York (state)
Women in New York City
1962 in sports in New York City
Forest Hills, Queens